Many elections occurred in 2021. The National Democratic Institute maintains a calendar of elections around the world.
 2021 United Nations Security Council election
 2021 national electoral calendar
 2021 local electoral calendar

Africa
 2021 Ugandan general election 14 January 2021
 2020–21 Central African general election 14 February 2021 (second round)
 2020–21 Nigerien general election 21 February 2021 (second round)
 2021 Ivorian parliamentary election 6 March 2021
 2021 Republic of the Congo presidential election 21 March 2021
 2021 Djiboutian presidential election 9 April 2021
 2021 Beninese presidential election 11 April 2021
 2021 Chadian presidential election 11 April 2021
 2021 Cape Verdean parliamentary election 18 April 2021
 2021 Somaliland parliamentary election 31 May 2021
 2021 Algerian legislative election 12 June 2021
 2021 Ethiopian general election 21 June 2021
 2021 São Toméan presidential election 18 July 2021 and 5 September 2021
 2021 Zambian general election 12 August 2021
 2021 Moroccan general election 8 September 2021
 2021 Cape Verdean presidential election 17 October 2021
 2021 Gambian presidential election 4 December 2021

Americas

Canada and Greenland
 Canada
 2021 Newfoundland and Labrador general election 25 March 2021
 2021 Yukon general election 12 April 2021
 2021 Nova Scotia general election 17 August 2021
 2021 Canadian federal election 20 September 2021
 2021 Nunavut general election 25 October 2021
 2021 Greenlandic general election 6 April 2021

The Caribbean, Central America, and Mexico
 Tobago
 January 2021 Tobago House of Assembly election 25 January 2021
 December 2021 Tobago House of Assembly election 6 December 2021
 2021 Salvadoran legislative election 28 February 2021
 2021 Curaçao general election 19 March 2021
 Antigua and Barbuda
 2021 Barbuda Council election 29 March 2021
 2021 Caymanian general election 14 April 2021
 Mexico
 2021 Mexican legislative election 6 June 2021
 2021 Mexican gubernatorial elections 6 June 2021
 2021 Aruban general election 25 June 2021
 2021 Saint Lucian general election 26 July 2021
 2021 Nicaraguan general election 7 November 2021
 2021 Honduran general election 28 November 2021

South America
 2021 Ecuadorian general election 7 February and 11 April
 Chile
 2021 Chilean Constitutional Convention election 15–16 May
 2021 Chilean general election 21 November
 2021 Peruvian general election 11 April and 6 June
 Argentina
 2021 Argentine legislative election 14 November 2021
 2021 Argentine provincial elections
 2021 Falkland Islands general election 4 November 2021

United States
 2020–21 United States Senate election in Georgia
 2020–21 United States Senate special election in Georgia
 2021 United States House of Representatives elections
 2021 United States gubernatorial elections

Asia
 2021 Kazakh legislative election 10 January 2021
 Kyrgyzstan
 2021 Kyrgyz presidential election 10 January 2021
 2021 Kyrgyz parliamentary election 28 November 2021
 2021 Laotian parliamentary election 21 February 2021
 2021 Vietnamese legislative election 23 May 2021
 2021 Mongolian presidential election 9 June 2021
 2021 Uzbek presidential election 24 October 2021
 2021 Japanese general election 31 October 2021
 2021 Hong Kong legislative election 19 December 2021
 2021 Elections in India

Europe
 2021 Portuguese presidential election 24 January 2021
 2021 Liechtenstein general election 7 February 2021
 Spain
 2021 Catalan regional election 14 February 2021
 2021 Madrilenian regional election 4 May 2021
 2021 Kosovan parliamentary election 14 February 2021
 Germany
 2021 Baden-Württemberg state election 14 March 2021
 2021 Rhineland-Palatinate state election 14 March 2021
 2021 Saxony-Anhalt state election 6 June 2021
 2021 Mecklenburg-Vorpommern state election 26 September 2021
 2021 Berlin state election 26 September 2021
 2021 German federal election 26 September 2021
 2021 Dutch general election 17 March 2021
 Bulgaria
 April 2021 Bulgarian parliamentary election 4 April 2021
 July 2021 Bulgarian parliamentary election 11 July 2021
 2021 Bulgarian general election 14 November 2021
 2021 Albanian parliamentary election 25 April 2021
 United Kingdom
 2021 London Assembly election 6 May 2021
 2021 Senedd (Welsh Parliament) election 6 May 2021
 2021 Scottish Parliament election 6 May 2021
 2021 Cypriot legislative election 30 May 2021
 2021 Armenian parliamentary election 20 June 2021
 2021 Moldovan parliamentary election 11 July 2021
 2021 Norwegian parliamentary election 13 September 2021
 2021 Russian legislative election 19 September 2021
 2021 Icelandic parliamentary election 25 September 2021
   Austria
  2021 Upper Austrian State election 26 September 2021
 2021 Czech legislative election 8–9 October 2021

Middle East
 2021 Israeli legislative election 23 March 2021
 2021 Syrian presidential election 26 May 2021
 2021 Iranian presidential election 18 June 2021
 2021 Qatari general election 2 October 2021
 2021 Iraqi parliamentary election 10 October 2021

Oceania
 2021 Micronesian parliamentary election 2 March 2021
 Australia
 2021 Western Australian state election 13 March 2021
 2021 Tasmanian state election 1 May 2021
 2021 Samoan general election 9 April 2021
 2021 Tongan general election 18 November 2021

See also 
 2020s in political history

References

 
2021
Elections
Elections